Austin Springs, Tennessee may refer to:

 Austin Springs, Washington County, Tennessee
 Austin Springs, Weakley County, Tennessee